Capsella bursa-pastoris, known as shepherd's purse because of its triangular flat fruits, which are purse-like, is a small annual and ruderal flowering plant in the mustard family (Brassicaceae). It is native to eastern Europe and Asia minor, but is naturalized and considered a common weed in many parts of the world, especially in colder climates, including British Isles, where it is regarded as an archaeophyte, North America and China, but also in the Mediterranean and North Africa. C. bursa-pastoris is the second-most prolific wild plant in the world, and is common on cultivated ground and waysides and meadows.

Scientists have referred to this species as a 'protocarnivore', since it has been found that its seeds attract and kill nematodes as a means to locally enrich the soil.

History 
Pictured and published in 1486.

Description

Capsella bursa-pastoris plants grow from a rosette of lobed leaves at the base. The flowers, which appear in any month of the year in the British Isles, are white and small,  in diameter, with four petals and six stamens. They are borne in loose racemes, and produce flattened, two-chambered seed pods known as silicles, which are triangular to heart-shaped, each containing several seeds.

Like a number of other plants in several plant families, its seeds contain a substance known as mucilage, a condition known as myxospermy. Recently, this has been demonstrated experimentally to perform the function of trapping nematodes, as a form of 'protocarnivory'.

Capsella bursa-pastoris is closely related to the model organism such as Arabidopsis thaliana and is also used as a model organism, due to the variety of genes expressed throughout its life cycle that can be compared to genes that are well studied in A. thaliana. Unlike most flowering plants, it flowers almost all year round. Like other annual ruderals exploiting disturbed ground, C. bursa-pastoris reproduces entirely from seed, has a long soil seed bank, and short generation time, and is capable of producing several generations each year.

Taxonomy
It was formally described by the Swedish botanist Carl Linnaeus in his seminal publication Species Plantarum in 1753, and then published by Friedrich Kasimir Medikus in Pflanzen-Gattungen (Pfl.-Gatt.) on page 85 in 1792.

Capsella bursa-pastoris subsp. thracicus (Velen.) Stoj. & Stef. is the only known subspecies.

William Coles wrote in his book, Adam in Eden (1657), "It is called Shepherd's purse or Scrip (wallet) from the likeness of the seed hath with that kind of leathearne bag, wherein Shepherds carry their Victualls [food and drink] into the field."

In England and Scotland, it was once commonly called 'mother's heart', from which was derived a child's game/trick of picking the seed pod, which then would burst and the child would be accused of 'breaking his mother's heart'.

Uses
Capsella bursa-pastoris gathered from the wild or cultivated has many uses, including for food, to supplement animal feed, for cosmetics, and in traditional medicine—reportedly to stop bleeding. The plant can be eaten raw; the leaves are best when gathered young. Native Americans ground it into a meal and made a beverage from it.

Cooking
It is cultivated as a commercial food crop in Asia.  In China, where it is known as jìcài it is commonly used in food in Shanghai and the surrounding Jiangnan region. The savory leaf is stir-fried with rice cakes and other ingredients or as part of the filling in wontons. It is one of the ingredients of the symbolic dish consumed in the Japanese spring-time festival, Nanakusa-no-sekku. In Korea, it is known as naengi and used as a root vegetable in the characteristic Korean dish, namul (fresh greens and wild vegetables).

Shepherd's purse was used as a pepper substitute in colonial New England.

Chemistry
Fumaric acid is one chemical substance that has been isolated from C. bursa-pastoris.

Parasites
Parasites of this plant include:
 White rust Albugo candida
 One species of downy mildew Hyaloperonospora parasitica
 Phoma herbarum

References

External links
 Mrs. M. Grieve. A Modern Herbal. Shepherd's Purse
 

bursa-pastoris
Carnivorous plants of Europe
Cosmopolitan species
Ruderal species
Edible plants
Asian vegetables
Medicinal plants of Asia
Medicinal plants of Europe
Plants described in 1753
Taxa named by Carl Linnaeus
Plants used in Native American cuisine